ERMC or Europe-Russia-Mongolia-China (also known as Europe-Russia-China or ERC) is an overland telecommunications cable system linking Asia and Europe via Russia and Mongolia. It provides an alternative, shorter path to submarine communications cables. The system's capacity can be increased from an as-built 40 Gbit/s to 400 Gbit/s.

Sources
  - Includes map of route.

Telecommunications infrastructure